Israel Yohana Natse (born 28 December 1963) is a Tanzanian CHADEMA politician and Member of Parliament for Karatu constituency since 2010.

References

1963 births
Living people
Chadema MPs
Tanzanian MPs 2010–2015
Ilboru Secondary School alumni
Tumaini University Makumira alumni
University of Helsinki alumni